Flash Forward is a Disney Channel Original Series produced in Canada for preteens and teenagers which was originally previewed on both Disney Channel and ABC from 1995 to 1996 with its main run starting from 1997 to 1999. The series first aired as a 4-episode limited-run preview on The Disney Channel from December 14, 1995 to January 6, 1996. Starting on September 14, 1996, the series aired as a special nationwide preview-run on ABC's Saturday morning lineup. On January 1, 1997, the series premiered on The Disney Channel with a special New Year's Day 5-hour, 10-episode marathon, and on January 5, the series moved to its regular time slot on Saturdays and Sundays.

The show focuses on the lives of two best friends and neighbors since birth, Tucker and Rebecca, and their respective adventures as they travel through the world of eighth grade with their other best friends, Christine and Miles. The show was produced by Atlantis Films in association with Disney Channel and Buena Vista International, Inc.

Flash Forward was the first series branded under the "Disney Channel Original Series" label.

Characters

Tuck James
Tucker "Tuck" James (Ben Foster) is a 13-year-old teenager  who has just started eighth grade and sees it as a life-altering event. Tucker faces the travails of a teen's life with his trademark humor and rebounds from the fouls dealt by bullies and the occasional intruding parent by seeking solace in his friendship with Miles. He and Becca have been best friends since they were born and remain committed to each other through thick and thin.
Tucker (age 5) is played by Marc Donato

Becca Fisher
Rebecca "Becca" Fisher (Jewel Staite), also 13, is the much-flustered best friend of Tucker and is experiencing the same disillusionment with eighth grade. Her new best friend is Christine, someone who Becca sees as an easier person than Tucker to confide in about the things that are starting to matter (namely boys). Becca also faces ridicule from her bossy and stuck-up sister Ellen and carries a secret crush on the local pizza maker, Gooch.
Becca (age 5) is played by Jennifer Pisana

Miles Vaughn
Miles (Theodore Borders) is Tucker's new best friend and starts the eighth grade year off as his constant companion. He often acts as the voice of reason in his relationship with Tucker, often bringing Tucker back down to the ground when he allows his flights of fancy to get the better of him.

Chris Harrison
Christine "Chris" Harrison (Asia Vieira) is Becca's new best friend and often finds herself in the middle of Becca's schemes and troubles. She serves as a source of companionship and most importantly a listener, someone Becca can confide in during their ever-changing world. Christine is the owner of the dubiously named Steve, a dog.

Horace James
Horace (Ricky Mabe) is Tucker's long-suffering younger brother. He is often the butt of Tucker's jokes and pranks, but holds a great deal of respect for his older brother. He is known for capturing all on his video camera, sometimes using the footage to his advantage as blackmail against Tucker.

Ellen Fisher
Played by both Rachel Blanchard (ep. 1–4) and Robin Brûlé. Ellen is Becca's domineering, self-centered older sister. She has no real respect for anyone other than herself and (arguably) her boyfriend Ryan. Ellen is often a source of pain and discomfort for her younger sister.

Episodes

References

External links

1990s American school television series
1990s American teen sitcoms
1990s Canadian teen sitcoms
1995 American television series debuts
1997 American television series endings
1995 Canadian television series debuts
1997 Canadian television series endings
American Broadcasting Company original programming
American adventure television series
Canadian adventure television series
Disney Channel original programming
English-language television shows
Television series about teenagers
Television shows filmed in Hamilton, Ontario
Television shows filmed in Toronto
Television series by Alliance Atlantis
Television series by Disney
Middle school television series